Tony Pabón (March 6, 1939 in San Juan – January 21, 2014) was a Puerto Rican-born, New York raised, singer, trumpeter and bandleader influential in the development of boogaloo.

His "Pete's Boogaloo", a tribute to Pete Rodriguez was the first boogaloo played on the radio. His other well known tracks included the mambo "El Capitan", on the album La Protesta.

Discography
 Tony Pabon and his All Stars (cover title) – also known as Tony Pabon y sus Estrellas
Songs
"I Like It Like That"
"El Capitan"

References

1939 births
2014 deaths
American bandleaders
American trumpeters
American male trumpeters
Singers from New York City
Singers from San Juan, Puerto Rico